Paul Hoffman (born 3 December 1955) is a Swazi weightlifter. He competed at the 1984 Summer Olympics and the 1988 Summer Olympics.

References

External links
 

1955 births
Living people
Swazi male weightlifters
Olympic weightlifters of Eswatini
Weightlifters at the 1984 Summer Olympics
Weightlifters at the 1988 Summer Olympics
Place of birth missing (living people)